Nice Bombs is a 2006 documentary film directed by Iraqi-American filmmaker Usama Alshaibi about his return to his home country to visit his family after the 2003 invasion of Iraq. The film is co-produced by Alshaibi's wife Kristie Alshaibi and co-executive produced by Studs Terkel.

Plot
In January 2004, shortly after officially becoming an American citizen, the Iraqi-born filmmaker Usama Alshaibi travels to Baghdad to visit the family he hasn't seen in over two decades. He makes the trip with his wife, Kristie, in tow.

Although Saddam Hussein had been captured by American forces in December, Baghdad is in a state of extreme turmoil with massive explosions a daily, frightening occurrence. Yet, Usama and Kristie are surprised by his family's nonchalance at the chaos. When a bomb blows up and rocks the entire house, Usama's cousin Tareef refers to the explosive device as a "nice bomb," hence the film's title.

Release 
Nice Bombs made its World Premiere at the 2006 Chicago Underground Film Festival where it won the Best Documentary award, which was especially fitting since Alshaibi has worked as a filmmaker primarily out of Chicago. Nice Bombs was theatrically released in New York at Two Boots Pioneer Theater and Chicago at the Gene Siskel Film Center. The film also screened at the 2007 New York Underground Film Festival and made its broadcast debut on the Sundance Channel in March 2008. The DVD distributor Cinema Obscura released Nice Bombs on DVD on October 27, 2009.

External links 
 
 
 
 
Nice Bombs film review, Variety
TimeOut Chicago, Bringing The War Home

2006 films
Iraqi-American history
American documentary films
2006 documentary films
Documentary films about the Iraq War
Films directed by Usama Alshaibi
2000s English-language films
2000s American films